In Sweet Remembrance is a 2014 play focusing on issues of race and segregation.  It was written by Tearrance Chisholm, while a student at the Catholic University of America and performed at other colleges.  The play has also been performed at colleges in Oklahoma and Kansas.

The play made headlines when an African-American student at Sweet Briar College placed "colored" and "whites only" labels on drinking fountains on campus following a performance of the play. The play was open to the public but was primarily a part of the 2014 freshman class orientation at the college. The incident, along with a "threatening phone call" believing the perpetrator to be white, prompted a lockdown of the college. The administration followed up with meetings with residents by the College President, an anonymous confession where the student apologized but said that her goal was to "make a point".  The perpetrator was ultimately identified and dismissed from the college.

References

2014 plays